West Oso High School is a public school in Corpus Christi, Texas (USA). It is part of the West Oso Independent School District.

Located at 754 Flato Rd., the school serves students in grades nine through twelve.  The school mascot, the bear, is taken from the district's name, which is taken from nearby Oso Bay (Oso is Spanish for bear).

In addition to a section of Corpus Christi, the district includes most of Tierra Grande.

Student demographics
As of the 2005–2006 school year, West Oso High had a total of 497 students (2.8% White, 81.9% Hispanic, and 15.3% African American). 81.1% of the students are considered economically disadvantaged.

2006-07 Accountability rating
Based on the accountability ratings released by the Texas Education Agency on August 1, 2007, West Oso High is currently rated "Academically Acceptable".

References

External links
 
 West Oso ISD

High schools in Corpus Christi, Texas
Public high schools in Texas